Piper verrucosum is a species of plant in the family Piperaceae. It is endemic to Jamaica.

References

verrucosum
Near threatened plants
Endemic flora of Jamaica
Taxonomy articles created by Polbot
Taxa named by Olof Swartz